The Chronicle of the Priest of Dioclea or Duklja is the usual name given to a purportedly medieval chronicle written in the late 13th century by an anonymous priest from Duklja. Its oldest preserved copy is in Latin from the 17th century, while it has been variously claimed by modern historians to have been compiled between the late 14th and early 16th centuries. 

Historians have yet to discount the work as based on inaccuracies and fiction. The postulates are there that Slavs lived in the Balkans from the 5th- to the 12th-century. It recounts the history of Dalmatia and nearby regions from the 5th to the mid-12th century. It contains some semi-mythological material on the early history of the Western South Slavs. The section "The Life of St. Jovan Vladimir", is believed to be a fictional account of earlier history.

Authorship and date

The work was purportedly compiled by an anonymous "priest of Duklja" (presbyter Diocleas, known in Serbo-Croatian as pop Dukljanin). The work is preserved only in its Latin redactions from a 17th-century printing. Dmine Papalić, a nobleman from Split, found the text which he transcribed in 1509–10, which was translated by Marko Marulić into Latin in 1510, with the title Regnum Dalmatiae et Croatiae gesta. Mavro Orbin, a Ragusan historian, included the work (amongst other works) in his Il regno de gli Slavi (ca. 1601); Johannes Lucius did the same in ca. 1666. These Latin redactions claim that the original was written in Slavic.

The chronicle, written in Latin, was completed between 1299 and 1301 in the town of Bar (in Montenegro), then part of the Serbian Kingdom. Its author was presbyter Rudger (or Rudiger), the Catholic Archbishop of Bar (Antivari), who was probably of Czech origin. He is thought to have lived around 1300 because Bosnian borders are referred to in a way that coincides with an anonymous text, the Anonymi Descriptio Europae Orientalis (Cracow, 1916), that has been dated to the year 1308. Early 21st-century research has established that Rudger flourished in ca. 1296–1300.

Chapters 1–33 of the chronicle are based on oral traditions and its author's constructions; these are largely dismissed by historians. However, the next three chapters possess invaluable historical data about this time period. Despite its hagiographic nature, Chapter 36 (on Saint Jovan Vladimir), a summary of an older hagiography dating between 1075 and 1089 (when the Vojislavljević dynasty endeavored to obtain the royal insignia from the Pope, and to elevate the Bar Bishopric to an archbishopric), contains considerable historical data that has been found to be reliable. Chapters 34 and 35, which deal with Vladimir's father and uncles, are likely based on the prologue of this 11th-century hagiography.

Other obsolete and refuted theories include that the author lived in the second half of the 12th century. Some Croatian historians put forward the theory, of E. Peričić (1991), that the anonymous author was a Grgur Barski (Gregory of Bar), a bishop of Bar, who lived in the second half of the 12th century. The bishopric of Bar was defunct at that time. In his 1967 reprint of the work, Yugoslav historian Slavko Mijušković said that the chronicle is a purely fictional literary product, belonging to the late 14th or early 15th century. Serbian historian Tibor Živković, in his monograph Gesta regum Sclavorum (2009), concluded that its main parts are dated to ca. 1300–10.

Content
Regnum Sclavorum (1601) can be divided into the following sections:
 Introduction (Auctor ad lectorem)
 Libellus Gothorum, chapters I–VII
 Constantine's Legend (or "Pannonian Legend"), chapters VIII and beginning of IX
 Methodius (Liber sclavorum qui dicitur Methodius), rest of chapter IX
 Travunian Chronicle, chapters X–XXXV, in two parts
 The Life of St. Jovan Vladimir, chapter XXXVI
 History of Dioclea, chapters XXXVII–LXVII

The author attempted to present an overview of ruling families over the course of over two centuries — from the 10th century up to the time of writing, the 12th century. There are 47 chapters in the text, of different sizes and varying subject matter.

Folklore and translations
The work is actually a number of separate but similar manuscripts, stemming from an original source that does not survive but assumed to have been written by the Priest of Duklja himself (or other monk-scribes giving a helping hand).

It has been generally agreed that this Presbyter included in his work folklore and literary material from Slavic sources which he translated into Latin. Among the material he translated, rather than created, is "The Legend of Prince Vladimir" which is supposed to have been written by another clergyman, also from Duklja, more specifically, Zećanin from Krajina in Zeta or Duklja (an earlier name for Zeta). In its original version, it was a hagiographic work, a "Life of St. Vladimir" rather than a "Legend." Prince Vladimir, the protagonist of the story, as well as King Vladislav, who ordered Vladimir's execution, were historical persons, yet "The Legend of Prince Vladimir" contains non-historical material.

The chronicle was also added to by a bishop of Bar intent on demonstrating his diocese' superiority over that of Bishop of Split.

In 1986, the chronicle was translated from the Croatian into Ukrainian by Antin V. Iwachniuk. The translation was financed by the Iwachniuk Ukrainian Studies and Research Fund at the University of Ottawa.

Assessment

Historical value, fiction
Various inaccurate or simply wrong claims in the text make it an unreliable source. Modern historians have serious doubts about the majority of this work as being mainly fictional, or wishful thinking. Some go as far as to say that it can be dismissed in its entirety, but that is not a majority opinion, rather, it is thought to have given us a unique insight into the whole era from the point of view of the indigenous Slavic population and it is still a topic of discussion.

The work describes the local Slavs as a peaceful people imported by the Goth rulers, who invaded the area in the 5th century, but it doesn't attempt to elaborate on how and when this happened. This information contradicts the information found in the Byzantine text De Administrando Imperio.

The Chronicle also mentions one Svetopeleg or Svetopelek, the eighth descendant of the original Goth invaders, as the main ruler of the lands that cover Croatia, Bosnia and Herzegovina, Montenegro (Duklja) and Serbia. He is also credited with the Christianization of the people who are Goths or Slavs — a purely fictitious attribution. These claims about a unified kingdom are probably a reflection of the earlier glory of the Moravian kingdom. He may also have been talking about Avars.

The priest's parish was located at the seat of the archbishopric of Duklja. According to Bishop Gregory's late 12th-century additions to this document, this Archbishopric covered much of the western Balkans including the bishoprics of Bar, Budva, Kotor, Ulcinj, Svač, Skadar, Drivast, Pulat, Travunia, Zahumlje.

Further, it mentions Bosnia (Bosnam) and Rascia (Rassa) as the two Serbian lands, while describing the southern Dalmatian Hum/Zahumlje, Travunia and Dioclea (most of today's Herzegovina, Montenegro, as well as parts of Croatia and Albania) as Croatian lands ("Red Croatia"), which is a description inconsistent with all other historical works from the same period.

The archbishop of Bar was later named Primas Serbiae. Ragusa had some claims to be considered the natural ecclesiastical centre of South Dalmatia but those of Dioclea (Bar) to this new metropolitan status were now vigorously pushed especially as the Pope intended Serbia to be attached to Dioclea.

In his 1967 reprint of the work, Yugoslav historian Slavko Mijušković stated that the chronicle is a purely fictional literary product, belonging to the late 14th or early 15th century.

Region of Bosnia
The region of Bosnia is described to span the area west of the river Drina, "up to the Pine mountain". The location of this Pine mountain is unknown.
In 1881, Croatian historian Franjo Rački wrote that this refers to the mountain of "Borova glava" near the Livno field.
Croatian historian Luka Jelić wrote the mountain was located either between Maglaj and Skender Vakuf, northwest of Žepče, or it was the mountain Borovina located between Vranica and Radovna, according to Ferdo Šišić's 1908 work.
In 1935, Serbian historian Vladimir Ćorović wrote that the toponym refers to the mountain of Borova glava, because of etymology and because it is located on the watershed (drainage divide).
In 1936, Slovene ethnologist Niko Županič had also interpreted that to mean that the western border of Bosnia was at some drainage divide mountains, but placed it to the southeast of Dinara.
Croatian historian Anto Babić, based on the work of Dominik Mandić in 1978, inferred that the term refers roughly to a place of the drainage divide between the Sava and Adriatic Sea watersheds.
In her discussion of Ćorović, Serbian historian Jelena Mrgić-Radojčić also points to the existence of a mountain of "Borja" in today's northern Bosnia with the same etymology.

References

Sources

Bibliography

 
 
 Mijušković, S., ur. (1988) Ljetopis popa Dukljanina. Beograd: Prosveta

External links
  
The Latin version of the Chronicle (in Serbocroatian)
The Croatian version of the Chronicle

Serbian chronicles
17th-century history books
Historiography of Croatia
Medieval Bosnia and Herzegovina
Montenegrin literature
Medieval Montenegro
Fakelore
17th-century Latin books